Holy Trinity Roman Catholic Church may refer to:

 Holy Trinity Roman Catholic Church (Chicago)
 Holy Trinity Roman Catholic Church (Milwaukee, Wisconsin)
 Holy Trinity Roman Catholic Church (Niagara Falls, New York)